Deepdene railway station may refer to:
Deepdene railway station, Melbourne, Australia
Dorking Deepdene railway station, England - formerly known (1923–1987) as Deepdene railway station